1260, or V2PX, was a demonstration computer virus written in 1989 by Mark Washburn that used a form of polymorphic encryption.  Derived from Ralf Burger's publication of the disassembled Vienna Virus source code, the 1260 added a cipher and varied its signature by randomizing its decryption algorithm.  Both the 1260 and Vienna infect .COM files in the current or PATH directories upon execution.  Changing an authenticated executable file is detected by most modern computer operating systems.

References

DOS file viruses
Hacking in the 1990s
Hacking in the 1980s